Haji Omar (1951 – 26 October 2008) was the amir (leader) of an Islamic political organization, the Pakistani Taliban. He was elected the amir after the death of Nek Muhammad Wazir. Haji Omar was killed during a US airstrike in Pakistan on 26 October 2008.

References 
 Haji Omar killed in US missile strike in Pak Online-International News Network, October 28, 2008 (accessed November 23, 2008)
 Taliban leader Omar killed in drone strike Daily Mail (Pakistan), October 28, 2008 (accessed November 23, 2008)

External links 
 Meeting Pakistan's Taleban chief
 Return of the Taliban: Interview Haji Omar PBS, October 3, 2006
 South Waziristan's Veteran Jihadi Leader: A Profile of Haji Omar The Jamestown Foundation, August 8, 2006

Pakistani politicians
1951 births
2008 deaths
Date of birth missing